Crustulina is a genus of comb-footed spiders that was first described by Anton Menge in 1868.

Species
 it contains seventeen species, found in Oceania, Africa, Asia, North America, and Europe:
Crustulina albovittata (Thorell, 1875) – Ukraine
Crustulina altera Gertsch & Archer, 1942 – USA
Crustulina ambigua Simon, 1889 – Madagascar
Crustulina bicruciata Simon, 1908 – Australia (Western Australia)
Crustulina conspicua (O. Pickard-Cambridge, 1872) – Egypt, Israel, Syria
Crustulina erythropus (Lucas, 1846) – Morocco, Algeria
Crustulina grayi Chrysanthus, 1975 – New Guinea
Crustulina guttata (Wider, 1834) (type) – Canary Is., Europe, Caucasus, Russia (Europe to South Siberia), Central Asia, China, Korea, Japan
Crustulina hermonensis Levy & Amitai, 1979 – Israel
Crustulina incerta Tullgren, 1910 – Tanzania
Crustulina jeanneli Berland, 1920 – East Africa
Crustulina lugubris Chrysanthus, 1975 – New Guinea
Crustulina molesta (Pavesi, 1883) – Ethiopia
Crustulina obesa Berland, 1920 – East Africa
Crustulina scabripes Simon, 1881 – Mediterranean
Crustulina starmuehlneri Kritscher, 1966 – New Caledonia
Crustulina sticta (O. Pickard-Cambridge, 1861) – North America, Europe, Turkey, Caucasus, Russia (Europe to Far East), Kazakhstan, Iran, Central Asia, China, Korea, Japan

In synonymy:
C. argus Lucas, 1846 = Crustulina scabripes Simon, 1881
C. borealis Banks, 1900 = Crustulina sticta (O. Pickard-Cambridge, 1861)
C. lineiventris (Pavesi, 1884) = Crustulina scabripes Simon, 1881
C. nitida Simon, 1884 = Crustulina scabripes Simon, 1881
C. pallipes Banks, 1906 = Crustulina sticta (O. Pickard-Cambridge, 1861)
C. rugosa (Thorell, 1875) = Crustulina sticta (O. Pickard-Cambridge, 1861)

See also
 List of Theridiidae species

References

External links

Araneomorphae genera
Cosmopolitan spiders
Theridiidae